KIDI-FM (105.1 FM, "La Buena") is a commercial radio station that is licensed to Lompoc, California and serves the  area. The station is owned by Emerald Wave Media and broadcasts a Spanish contemporary radio format.

History
The station first signed on in 1999 as KAOH, then changed its call letters to KWSZ the following year. In 2002, Coast West Broadcasting sold the station to New Century AZ LLC for $900,000.

On July 1, 2006, under new ownership by Emerald Wave Media, KWSZ flipped from adult hits to Spanish contemporary with the branding "Concierto 105.1 FM". A matching call sign, KRTO, was assigned by the Federal Communications Commission on July 18.

On September 28, 2007, KWSZ adopted the KIDI-FM call sign, which previously had been used at the 105.5 FM frequency before it was abandoned by Emerald Wave Media.

On January 18, 2010, high winds in the Point Sal area caused a power outage that knocked the KIDI-FM transmitter off the air. Power to the transmitter was restored the same day, allowing KIDI-FM to resume broadcasting.

References

External links

IDI-FM
Santa Barbara County, California
IDI-FM